"Write Me a Letter" is a song by American hard rock band Aerosmith. The song was written by lead-singer Steven Tyler and is the sixth song on Aerosmith's self-titled debut album, Aerosmith. The song is mostly a rock and roll song; it starts off with a drum line and goes into slow blues jam with Tyler singing about a letter from a lover he is waiting for. The song is the first use of the harmonica in an Aerosmith song.

In performance
The song was played constantly in the early to mid-seventies and most often was the opening song or the second song in their setlist. The first-known performance of the song was on March 20, 1973, at Paul's Mall in Boston. A live version is included on Pandora's Box.

References 

Songs about letters (message)
1973 singles
Aerosmith songs
Songs written by Steven Tyler
1973 songs
Columbia Records singles
Song recordings produced by Adrian Barber